JC Kritzinger (born 4 December 1987) is a former South African rugby union footballer.

References

1987 births
Living people
South African rugby union players
Stormers players
Western Province (rugby union) players
Rugby union props
Afrikaner people
Rugby union players from the Eastern Cape